Algarrobo blanco is a common name of Spanish origin for several plants and may refer to:

 Prosopis alba
 sometimes Prosopis pallida, native to Colombia, Ecuador, and Peru